Sofapaka Football Club (Sofapaka: Sote kama Familia kwa Pamoja Kuafikia Azimio – Kiswahili: We as a Family together to achieve a goal) is a football club, based in Wundanyi, Taita Taveta County. They play their home games at the Wundanyi Stadium (also Known as Dawson Mwanyumba Stadium).

History
The club originates from the men’s fellowship of the MAOS Ministries football team founded in 2002, which took part in inter-church competitions. In 2004, Elly Kalekwa took over the team and formed Sofapaka, and eventually joined the Nationwide league. The team won the President's Cup in 2007, while still playing in the Nationwide League.

The team's shirt sponsor is Betika, a sports betting company in Kenya.

Achievements
Jamhuri Cup Winner: 1

 2018

Sportpesa Shield Cup: 2

 2018

Kenyan Premier League: 5

 2018

Mashujaa Cup Winner: 1

 2017

Kenyan Premier League: 2
 2017.

Kenyan Premier League: 1

 2009

Kenyan President's Cup: 3

 2007, 2010, 2014

KPL Top 8 Cup: 0

Kenyan Super Cup: 2

 2010, 2011

CECAFA Clubs Cup: 0

Performance in CAF competitions
CAF Champions League: 1 appearance
2010 – Preliminary Round

CAF Confederation Cup: 3 appearances
2008 – Disqualified
2011 – Play-off Round
2015 – Preliminary Round

Current squad

References

External links
 www.sofapakafc.co.ke
 www.sofapaka.com
 Kenyan Footie – Kenyan Football Portal
  -MichezoAfrika

Kenyan Premier League clubs
Football clubs in Kenya
Sport in Nairobi
2004 establishments in Kenya